Mark Lambert (born 19 February 1985 in London) is a former rugby union player for Harlequins in the Gallagher Premiership. He played as a Prop.

Lambert represented England at U19 and U21 level. He made his debut for the England Saxons against the Argentina Jaguars at the 2009 Churchill Cup.

He was a replacement for Harlequins in their 2011–12 Premiership final victory over Leicester Tigers.

In November 2017, he was elected as the chairman of the Rugby Players' Association

He holds the rather inauspicious record of being the player most used as a substitute in Gallagher Premiership history.

He announced his retirement in June 2020.

References

External links
Harlequins profile

1985 births
Living people
English rugby union players
Harlequin F.C. players
Rugby union props
People educated at Royal Grammar School, Guildford
Rugby union players from London